Watery Grave may refer to:
 Burial at sea
 Watery Grave (novel), a novel by Bruce Alexander
 Watery Grave (EP), an EP by Miracle Fortress